Benjamin Gordon "Bubba" Dickerson (born May 6, 1981) is an American professional golfer who was previously a PGA Tour member and currently plays on the Nationwide Tour.  He is best known for winning the 2001 U.S. Amateur.

Dickerson was born in Jacksonville, Florida.  He accepted an athletic scholarship to attend the University of Florida in Gainesville, Florida, where he played for coach Buddy Alexander's Florida Gators men's golf team in National Collegiate Athletic Association (NCAA) competition in 2000 and 2001.  Dickerson was runner-up in the 2000 U.S. Amateur Public Links championship.  In 2001, he was a member of the Florida Gators team that won the NCAA Championship, and followed that with a win at the Western Amateur.  Dickerson received second-team All-Southeastern Conference (SEC) honors in 2000 and first-team All-SEC honors in 2001, and was a first-team All-American in 2001.

In the U.S. Amateur that fall, Dickerson made the finals against Robert Hamilton.  In the 36-hole final match, Dickerson was down five holes through fourteen played but won the last four holes of the morning round to pull within one.  The afternoon round was very close, and Dickerson won the final two holes to go from one down to a one-up victory.

The winner of the U.S. Amateur gains entry into the following year's Masters, U.S. Open, and British Open, so long as he remains an amateur.  Dickerson played in the Masters, but after the tournament, he decided to leave school and turn professional, giving up the chance to play in the other two majors.

Dickerson played on the European Challenge Tour in 2003, the NGA Hooters Tour in 2004, and the Nationwide Tour in 2005, 2008-2019.  In 2006 and 2007, he qualified for the PGA Tour.  He picked up his first professional win at the Chitimacha Louisiana Open in 2009 on the Nationwide Tour with a one hole playoff victory over Brian Vranesh.

The nickname "Bubba" came from his older brother Robert, who could not pronounce the word "brother" as a young child.

Amateur wins (2)
2001 Western Amateur, U.S. Amateur

Professional wins (1)

Nationwide Tour wins (1)

Nationwide Tour playoff record (1–0)

Results in major championships

CUT = missed the half-way cut
Note: Dickerson never played in The Open Championship or the PGA Championship.

See also

2005 PGA Tour Qualifying School graduates
List of Florida Gators men's golfers on the PGA Tour

References

External links

U.S. Amateur victory

American male golfers
Florida Gators men's golfers
PGA Tour golfers
Golfers from Jacksonville, Florida
People from Hilliard, Florida
1981 births
Living people